Boombox is a remix album by Finnish singer Robin, released on 11 March 2014. Like its parent album Boom Kah, Boombox also reached number one on the Finnish Albums Chart.

Track listing

Charts

Release history

See also
List of number-one albums of 2014 (Finland)

References

2014 remix albums
Robin (singer) albums